Epiphthora belonodes is a moth of the family Gelechiidae. It was described by Edward Meyrick in 1904. It is found in Australia, where it has been recorded from Western Australia.

The forewings are whitish, densely irrorated (sprinkled) with dark fuscous and with an undefined white streak along the submedian fold. The hindwings are grey.

References

Moths described in 1904
Epiphthora
Taxa named by Edward Meyrick